Lionel Repka (7 February 1935 – 27 April 2015) was a Canadian professional ice hockey defenceman, born in  Edmonton, Alberta.

Career
Repka began his career with the Edmonton Oil Kings of the WCJHL, and the Spokane Spokes, Seattle Americans and Edmonton Flyers of the WHL, before going to the IHL.

Over eleven seasons in the International Hockey League (1958–69) Repka played 666 games - all with the Fort Wayne Komets. His number 6 is retired by Fort Wayne. He retired from hockey, sold insurance and died of cancer in 2015.

Awards
The IHL awarded Repka the Governor's Trophy as the league's most outstanding defenceman during the 1964-65 season.

References

External links

1935 births
2015 deaths
Canadian ice hockey defencemen
Edmonton Flyers (WHL) players
Edmonton Oil Kings (WCHL) players
Fort Wayne Komets players
Seattle Americans players
Spokane Spokes players
Ice hockey people from Edmonton